The 1st constituency of Yvelines is a French legislative constituency in the Yvelines département.

Description
The 1st constituency of Yvelines includes most of the historic royal city of Versailles.

Politically the seat has been a stronghold of the right since its creation in 1968. In its entire history it has only been represented by four men. Its first deputy Bernard Destremau was a noted tennis player and diplomat.

Historic representation

Election results

2022

 
 
 
 
 
 
 
|-
| colspan="8" bgcolor="#E9E9E9"|
|-

2017

 
 
 
 
 
 
 
|-
| colspan="8" bgcolor="#E9E9E9"|
|-

2012

 
 
 
 
 
 
 
|-
| colspan="8" bgcolor="#E9E9E9"|
|-

2007

 
 
 
 
 
 
|-
| colspan="8" bgcolor="#E9E9E9"|
|-

2002

 
 
 
 
 
 
 
|-
| colspan="8" bgcolor="#E9E9E9"|
|-

1997

 
 
 
 
 
 
 
 
 
|-
| colspan="8" bgcolor="#E9E9E9"|
|-

Sources
Official results of French elections from 2002: "Résultats électoraux officiels en France" (in French).

1